The Manulife LPGA Classic was a women's professional golf tournament on the LPGA Tour. The 72-hole, full-field event was first played in June 2012 at the Grey Silo Golf Course in Waterloo, Ontario, Canada. The title sponsor was Manulife Financial, a global insurance company and financial services provider with headquarters in Toronto.

At the inaugural event in 2012, Brittany Lang won her first LPGA title in a four-way sudden-death playoff. It was the first-ever win on the tour by an alumna of Duke. The runners-up were Hee Kyung Seo, Inbee Park, and Chella Choi. After missing a birdie putt at the par-5 18th to win in regulation, Lang birdied the same hole three straight times in the playoff.

In 2015, the tournament moved to Whistle Bear Golf Club in Cambridge, about 18 km south of Grey Silo GC, where it remained for 2016 and 2017.

In 2017, the Manulife LPGA Classic was announced to become Manulife's final tournament as the title sponsor and a new one was never found.

Tournament names
2012–2014: Manulife Financial LPGA Classic
2015–2017: Manulife LPGA Classic

Winners

Tournament records

References

External links

LPGA.com tournament microsite
Whistle Bear Golf Club
Grey Silo Golf Course – (2012–2014)

Former LPGA Tour events
Women's golf tournaments in Canada
Sport in Waterloo, Ontario
Sport in Cambridge, Ontario
Women in Ontario